The Elnathan Nye House is a historic house at 33 Old Main Road in North Falmouth, Massachusetts.  The oldest portion of this -story house was built c. 1735; it was extended to its present five-bay facade in 1772.  The interior of the house is particularly well preserved, with three extant beehive ovens, plaster-and-lath walls, and period wood paneling.  The property's barn may also date to the 18th century.  Elnathan Nye, the builder, was a prominent local citizen.

The house was listed on the National Register of Historic Places in 2002.

See also
National Register of Historic Places listings in Barnstable County, Massachusetts

References

1735 establishments in Massachusetts
Houses completed in 1735
Falmouth, Massachusetts
Houses on the National Register of Historic Places in Barnstable County, Massachusetts